Dobrojewo may refer to the following places:
Dobrojewo, Greater Poland Voivodeship (west-central Poland)
Dobrojewo, Lubusz Voivodeship (west Poland)
Dobrojewo, West Pomeranian Voivodeship (north-west Poland)